Lieutenant-General William Dowdeswell (27 February 1760 – 1 December 1828) was a British soldier and politician from Worcestershire.

Career
The 3rd son of William Dowdeswell, he joined the army as a Lieutenant and Captain in the 1st Foot Guards in 1785.

On the opening of the war with revolutionary France he served with his regiment in the Flanders Campaign under the Duke of York 1793, seeing action at the siege of Valenciennes and the Siege of Dunkirk. Made Colonel of the 86th Foot 26 Jan 1797, Dowdeswell was appointed Governor of the Bahamas from 1797 to 1802. On 29th Sept 1803 he was promoted Major-General, then was posted to India under Lake from 1805. He took part in the siege of Bhurtpore. He was made Commander-in-Chief in India in 1807, and promoted Lieutenant-General on 25 July 1810.

He was a Member of Parliament (MP) for Tewkesbury from 1792 to 1797.

His family owned the Pull Court estate near Bushley in Worcestershire, and many of his ancestors had been MPs, including his father William Dowdeswell, who was Chancellor of the Exchequer from 1785 to 1766.

Dowdeswell was known as a collector of prints by old English engravers and made a speciality of grangerizing. He died unmarried in 1828, his estates, including Pull Court, passing to his younger brothers.

References 

1750 births
1828 deaths
People from Malvern Hills District
Members of the Parliament of Great Britain for English constituencies
British MPs 1790–1796
British MPs 1796–1800
British Army lieutenant generals
British Army commanders of the Napoleonic Wars
British governors of the Bahamas